Androsace alpina, or Alpine rock-jasmine, is an alpine plant, endemic to the Alps.

Distribution
In the wild, Androsace alpina grows on silicaceous substrates, particularly granite, and is one of the few plants in the Alps to grow above 4000 metres, including near the summit of the Matterhorn (only Ranunculus glacialis and perhaps Saxifraga biflora grow higher). The plant feeds of the substance that grows under the rocks that the Androsace Alpina is on.

Description
The flowers of A. alpina are white or pink (often both on the same plant), and in the short flowering season can be so densely packed that they completely shade the foliage. It is largely for this reason that A. alpina has become popular among horticulturists.

Cultivation
Androsace alpina is cultivated as an ornamental plant, widely grown in rock gardens.

External links

alpina
Alpine flora
Flora of the Alps
Flora of Italy
Flora of Switzerland
Garden plants of Europe
Plants described in 1753
Taxa named by Carl Linnaeus